Two referendums were held in Switzerland in 1968. The first was held on 18 February on a general tax amnesty, and was approved by 62% of voters. The second was held on 19 May on a tobacco tax, and was rejected by 52% of voters.

Results

February: General tax amnesty

May: Tobacco tax

References

1968 referendums
1968 in Switzerland
Referendums in Switzerland